The cherry is the fruit of many plants of the genus Prunus. The plants themselves are also called cherries, and the wood they produce is called cherry.

Cherry may also refer to:

Plants and fruits 
 Cherry, Bourreria baccata (family Boraginaceae), native to the Americas
 Cherry, the fruit of the coffee tree, Coffea 
 Barbados cherry or acerola, Malpighia glabra (family Malpighiaceae) and its fruit
 Jamaica cherry, ornamental cherry, Singapore cherry, West Indian cherry, Muntingia calabura (family Muntingiaceae) and its fruit
 Jerusalem cherry, Solanum pseudocapsicum (family Solanaceae)
 Various species of Eugenia (family Myrtaceae), including:
 Brazil cherry, Eugenia brasiliensis
 Surinam cherry or Brazil cherry, Eugenia uniflora
 Various species of Exocarpos (family Santalaceae), native to south-east Asia, Australia, and the Pacific, including:
Exocarpos cupressiformis Labill., cherry ballart, cypress cherry
Exocarpos latifolius R.Br., broad-leaved cherry
Exocarpos sparteus R.Br., slender cherry
Exocarpos strictus R.Br., dwarf cherry
 Various species of Pseudolmedia glabrata (family Moraceae)
 Various species of Syzygium (family Myrtaceae), including:
Syzygium aqueum, water cherry
Syzygium australe, brush cherry (Australia)
 Syzygium corynanthum, sour cherry
Syzygium crebrinerve, purple cherry
Syzygium luehmannii, cherry satinash
Syzygium paniculatum, magenta cherry (Australia)

Places

United States
 Cherry, Arizona, a mining ghost town
 Cherry, Illinois, a village
 Cherry, Minnesota, an unincorporated community
 Cherry, Tennessee, an unincorporated community
 Cherry, West Virginia, an unincorporated community
 Cherry County, Nebraska
 Cherry Lake, an artificial lake in the Stanislaus National Forest of Tuolumne County, California

Multiple locations
 Cherry Creek (disambiguation)
 Cherry Gardens (disambiguation)
 Cherry Island (disambiguation)
 Cherry River (disambiguation)
 Cherry Street (disambiguation)
 Cherry Township (disambiguation)

People
 Cherry (given name)
 Cherry (surname)
 Cherry (athlete) (born 1973), Burmese Olympic hurdler
 Cherry (wrestler), ring name of retired female American professional wrestler Kara Drew (born 1975)
 Ram Charan (born 1985), Indian actor also known as "Cherry" or "Cherry Tej"
 Arnaldo Sentimenti (1914–1997), Italian football player and coach nicknamed "Cherry"
 Cherry Vanilla, stage name of American singer Kathleen Dorritie (born 1943)

Arts and entertainment

Fictional characters
 Cherry (Urusei Yatsura), in the Japanese manga series Urusei Yatsura
 Cherry Ames, in a series of novels by Helen Wells and Julie Campbell Tatham
 Cherry Clay, in the British soap opera Doctors
 Cherry Valance, in the 1967 novel The Outsiders
 Chubby Cherry (also known as simply Cherry), animated lead singer of the virtual band Studio Killers

Film and television
 Cherry (2010 film), a 2010 American comedy directed by Jeffrey Fine
 About Cherry, a 2012 American drama film about the porn industry originally titled Cherry
 Cherry (2021 film), a 2021 crime drama directed by the Russo brothers
 "Cherry" (The Boys), a 2019 episode of The Boys

Music

Groups
 Cherry (band), a 1990s Australian girl group
 Cherry, former name of American music duo Ratatat

Albums and EPs
 Cherry (EP), a 1991 EP by Curve
 Cherry (Jimmy McGriff album), 1966
 Cherry (Lisa Shaw album), 2005
 Cherry (Shit and Shine album), 2008
 Cherry (Stanley Turrentine album), 1972

Songs
 "Cherry" (jazz standard), a 1928 song composed by Don Redman and Ray Gilbert
 "Cherry" (Yui song), "C.H.E.R.R.Y.", a 2007 Japanese song by Yui
 "Cherry", a 2012 song by Chromatics
 "Cherry", a 2017 song by Lana Del Rey from Lust for Life
 "Cherry", a 2018 song by Rina Sawayama
 "Cherry", a 2019 song by Itzy from their debut album It'z Icy
 "Cherry", a 2019 song by Harry Styles from Fine Line

Other arts and entertainment
 Cherry (comics), adult comic book series
 Cherry (Moiseenko painting), a 1969 painting by Russian artist Evsey E. Moiseenko
 Cherry (novel), a 2018 novel by Nico Walker

Business
 Cherry (keyboards), German keyboard manufacturer
 Cherry Red Airline, also known as the Cherry Air Service, first airline in Prince Albert, Saskatchewan, Canada
 Nissan Cherry, a Japanese automobile model
 SM Cherry, Philippine supermall brand

Other uses
 The Cherries, nickname of English football team A.F.C. Bournemouth

See also
 Cherie, a given name
 Cherrie, a given and surname
 Cerise (disambiguation)
 Chery (disambiguation)